List of Canadian ambassadors to Israel Diplomatic relations between Canada and Israel were established on July 28, 1954. The Ambassador to Greece was concurrently accredited as Ambassador to Israel, resident in Greece. Entitled as Ambassador Extraordinary and Plenipotentiary unless otherwise noted.

References

Israel
 
Canada